Zinc finger protein 142 is a protein that in humans is encoded by the ZNF142 gene.

Function

The protein encoded by this gene belongs to the Kruppel family of C2H2-type zinc finger proteins. It contains 31 C2H2-type zinc fingers and may be involved in transcriptional regulation. Alternatively spliced transcript variants have been found for this gene.

References

Further reading